Reas Pass, elevation , is a mountain pass on the Continental Divide in Fremont County, Idaho, about  southwest of West Yellowstone, Montana. The pass lies essentially on the Idaho-Montana border, but modern maps show that the summit lies entirely in Idaho, because the Divide and the state line do not quite coincide here. The pass is also somewhat unusual in that, despite being the lowest crossing of the Divide in the vicinity, it has evidently never been traversed by a highway of any significance.  Starting in 1909, it was used by a branch line of the Union Pacific Railroad running between Ashton, Idaho and West Yellowstone; however, the line eventually became unprofitable and was closed in 1979.

References 

Landforms of Fremont County, Idaho
Rail mountain passes of the United States
Mountain passes of Idaho